Lucy Katherine O'Reilly (born 9 November 1999) is an Irish cricketer who plays primarily as a right-arm medium bowler. In June 2018, she was named in Ireland's squad for the 2018 ICC Women's World Twenty20 Qualifier tournament. She was the leading wicket-taker for the tournament, with eleven dismissals in four matches. Following the conclusion of the tournament, she was named as the rising star of Ireland's squad by the International Cricket Council (ICC). In July 2018, she was named in the ICC Women's Global Development Squad. She played in the Women's Super Series for Scorchers.

In October 2018, she was named in Ireland's squad for the 2018 ICC Women's World Twenty20 tournament in the West Indies. Ahead of the tournament, she was named as one of the players to watch. She was the leading wicket-taker for Ireland in the tournament, with four dismissals in three matches. In April 2019, O'Reilly took a voluntary break from cricket.

References

External links

1999 births
Living people
Irish women cricketers
Ireland women One Day International cricketers
Ireland women Twenty20 International cricketers
Cricketers from County Dublin
Scorchers (women's cricket) cricketers